Randolph Beazer is a Barbudan politician. He was elected to the Barbuda Council in 2005 and served as its chairman from 19 January 2006 to 9 January 2008.

References

Antigua and Barbuda politicians
Living people
Year of birth missing (living people)
Place of birth missing (living people)
Chairs of the Barbuda Council
Members of the Barbuda Council
People from Barbuda